Dragan Bošković is a Montenegrin professional footballer who plays as a striker.

Club career
On 10 January 2020 Dragan signed for Chonburi F.C.

International career
In 2012, Bošković debuted for Montenegro in a friendly match against Iceland, coming on in the final minute of the game. This has been his only international cap so far.

References

External links

 

1985 births
Living people
People from Berane
Association football forwards
Serbia and Montenegro footballers
Montenegrin footballers
Montenegro international footballers
OFK Grbalj players
FK Budućnost Podgorica players
Dragan Boskovic
Dragan Boskovic
Dragan Boskovic
Dragan Boskovic
Second League of Serbia and Montenegro players
Montenegrin First League players
Dragan Boskovic
Montenegrin expatriate footballers
Expatriate footballers in Thailand
Montenegrin expatriate sportspeople in Thailand